Rae Theotis Carruth (born Rae Lamar Wiggins; January 20, 1974) is a former American football wide receiver, and convicted murderer. After playing college football at Colorado, Carruth was drafted in the first round of the 1997 NFL Draft by the Carolina Panthers of the National Football League (NFL) and spent three seasons with the team.

In 2001, he was found guilty of conspiring to murder his then-girlfriend Cherica Adams, who was pregnant with his child. Including pre-trial confinement, he served 18 years of an 18-to-24-year sentence in the North Carolina state prison system and was released from the Sampson Correctional Institution in Clinton, North Carolina, on October 22, 2018.

Early life 
Born and raised in Sacramento, California, Carruth attended Valley High School. He was accepted on a football scholarship to the University of Colorado Boulder, in Boulder, Colorado.

College career
He played four seasons for the Buffaloes and was named a first-team All-American in 1996. His quarterbacks at CU were future pros Koy Detmer and Kordell Stewart. Carruth earned his degree with a double major in English.  Carruth caught 135 passes for 2,540 yards and 11 touchdowns in his four seasons, with an average of 18.8 yards per catch.

Professional career
Carruth was a first-round draft pick in the 1997 NFL Draft, taken by the Carolina Panthers with the 27th overall selection. He signed a four-year, $3.7 million deal that included a $1.3 million signing bonus.

Carruth had a respectable rookie season in 1997 and started 14 games. Wearing uniform number 89, he caught 44 passes for 545 yards and four touchdown passes, tied for first among rookie receivers. He was named to the all-rookie team at wide receiver.

He broke his right foot in the opening game of 1998, and did not catch another pass that season due to the injury. He ended the year with four catches for 59 yards (all on opening day). He played in the first six games of the 1999 season, with 14 catches for 200 yards.

Personal life
During Carruth's sophomore year at Colorado, his girlfriend, Michelle Wright, gave birth to their son Rae Jr. Wright sued him for child support, and Wright later testified that Carruth agreed to pay $2,700 in child support, half of what he was ordered to pay by a judge, and she had accepted on condition that he be a better father.

Crimes
On November 16, 1999, near Carruth's home in Charlotte, North Carolina, Cherica Adams, a real estate agent he had been casually dating, was shot four times using a .357 caliber Charter Arms revolver by Van Brett Watkins Sr., a nightclub manager and an associate of Carruth. Adams managed to call 911, and said that Carruth had stopped his vehicle in front of hers, and that another vehicle drove alongside and its passenger had shot her. Carruth then drove away from the scene.

Adams was eight months pregnant with Carruth's child at the time. Soon after her admission to the hospital, she fell into a coma. Doctors delivered the baby via emergency caesarean section. Carruth went to the police and posted $3 million bail, on condition that if either Adams or the infant died, he would turn himself in. Adams died on December 14, 1999. The baby, named Chancellor Lee Adams, survived, but suffered permanent brain damage and cerebral palsy as a result of being without oxygen for 70 minutes before he was born. Chancellor Lee graduated from Vance High School in 2021 at age 21.

Carruth quickly fled after Adams' death, but was captured on December 15 in West Tennessee, found hiding in the trunk of a car outside a motel in Parkers Crossroads. The trunk also contained $3,900 cash, bottles of his urine, extra clothes, candy bars, and a cell phone. The Panthers waived him on December 16, citing a morals clause in his contract, and the NFL suspended him indefinitely on December 17.

At trial, prosecutors contended that Carruth hired Watkins and others to murder Adams because of her refusal to abort their unborn child. Carruth's lawyer David Rudolf claimed that Carruth had been caught up in a drug deal gone bad. They claimed that on the night of the shooting, after Carruth had refused to fund the drug deal, Watkins shot Adams in a sudden rage when she "flipped him off" after he had attempted to ask her about Carruth's whereabouts.

Carruth was found guilty of conspiracy to commit murder, shooting into an occupied vehicle, and using an instrument to destroy an unborn child. He was found not guilty of first degree murder, sparing him from possible execution. Carruth was sentenced to 18 years and 11 months to 24 years and 4 months in prison.

Van Brett Watkins Sr., was sentenced to prison for a minimum of 40 years, 8 months and a maximum 50 years, 8 months for the murder of Cherica Adams.

Carruth sent a letter in 2018 apologizing to Saundra Adams, the mother of Cherica Adams, via WBTV in Charlotte, North Carolina, for accusing her of lying about him in interviews for years.

Carruth was released on October 22, 2018, after serving 18 years. He moved to Pennsylvania after his release.

References

Further reading

External links
Rae Carruth murder case compendium
North Carolina Department of Correction Public Access Information System - Rae Carruth

TruTV series Mugshots: Rae Carruth - NFL Hitman episode published by FilmRise
Crime in Sports #001 - Did Tracy Morgan Shoot a Pregnant Woman? - The Saga of Rae Carruth

1974 births
Living people
21st-century American criminals
African-American players of American football
American football wide receivers
American male criminals
American people convicted of murder
American sportspeople convicted of crimes
Carolina Panthers players
Colorado Buffaloes football players
Crime in North Carolina
Criminals from California
People convicted of murder by North Carolina
Players of American football from Sacramento, California
21st-century African-American sportspeople
20th-century African-American sportspeople
Sportspeople convicted of murder